is a Japanese science fiction writer whose work was first published in 1991. In 2006 Kazuma won the Seiun Award for Summer / Time / Traveler.

Selected works 
 Hōrai gakuen (蓬莱学園), 1991–1997
 Marion & Co. (マリオン&Co.), 1997
 Kurou denshō (狗狼伝承), 1998–2001
 Hoshino, baberu (星の、バベル), 2002
 Jesters' Galaxy (ジェスターズ・ギャラクシー), 2002–2004
 Isuberu no sen fu (イスベルの戦賦), 2003
 Summer / Time / Traveler (サマー/タイム/トラベラー), 2005
 Light Novel „Chō“ Nyūmon (ライトノベル「超」入門), 2006

External links 
 Interview with author (In Japanese)

Japanese science fiction writers
Living people
Year of birth missing (living people)